Hawford is a hamlet in Worcestershire, England.

It falls within two parishes; North Claines and Ombersley and Doverdale in the outer suburbs of Worcester about 3 miles from the city centre. It is bisected by the River Salwarpe, the Droitwich - Worcester Canal and is also bounded by the River Severn.

Landmarks
Hawford Dovecote, owned by the National Trust, is a 16th-century half-timbered building. It is a remnant of a former monastic grange.

Hawford House to the south of Hawford is a Grade II listed 18th century house, now converted to apartments.

External links

 National Trust: Hawford Dovecote

Villages in Worcestershire